Waiting for My Rocket to Come is the debut studio album by the American singer-songwriter Jason Mraz, released on October 15, 2002, by Elektra Records. It was his only studio release on that label before he moved to Atlantic Records. By December 2003, the album had sold 500,000 copies, prompting Entertainment Weekly to dub Mraz "The winner of 2003’s sensitive singer-songwriter sweepstakes". The album's commercial success occurred partly because of its successful Top 40 single "The Remedy (I Won't Worry)", as well as Mraz's energetic live performances and extensive self-promotion.

Mraz said the title was an optimistic title, reflecting the process of playing music while simultaneously preparing for success while waiting for success to arrive.

Track listing

Personnel
Jason Mraz – lead vocals on all tracks, acoustic guitar on all tracks, backing vocals on tracks 3 and 6

Additional personnel
John Alagía – Hammond organ on tracks 1, 2, 6, 8 and 12, electric guitar on track 3, tambourine on tracks 1, 2, 3, 6 and 12, shaker on tracks 1, 3 and 6, Wurlitzer on tracks 3 and 6, Record producer on all tracks, mixing on all tracks
Brian Jones – drums on all tracks
Stewart Myers – bass guitar on all tracks
Michael Andrews – electric guitar on tracks 1, 2, 3, 4, 5, 6, 7, 8, 9, 10 and 12, acoustic guitar on track 3, slide guitar on tracks 1 and 5, lap steel guitar on tracks 6, 7, 8 and 9, banjo on track 5, celesta on track 4, ukulele on tracks 4, 6 and 9, mellotron on track 4, horn arrangement on track 10
Greg Kurstin – organ on tracks 2, 3, 7, 9 and 11, clavinet on tracks 2, 7 and 10, synthesizer on tracks 3 and 12, electric piano on tracks 3 and 6, Rhodes piano on track 10
Alex McCallum – electric guitar on tracks 2, 9, 10 and 11, acoustic guitar on track 4, ebo on tracks 4, 8 and 12, synthesizer on tracks 8 and 10, Wurlitzer on track 10
Noel "Toca" Rivera – backing vocals on tracks 3 and 6, tambourine on track 9, djembe on track 12
Julie "Hesta Prynn" Potash – backing vocals on track 5
Carla Dekker  – backing vocals on track 5
Geannie Meisenholder  – backing vocals on track 5
Nicki Bateson  – backing vocals on track 5
Shane Endsley – trumpet on tracks 10 and 12
Scot Ray – trombone on track 10
Ben Wendel – saxophone on track 10
Guy Hilsman – shaker on track 12
Jeff Juliano – mixing on all tracks, engineering on all tracks
Peter Harding – engineering assistance on all tracks
Chris Keup – pre-production on all tracks, arrangement assistance on all tracks
Ted Jensen – mastering on all tracks

Charts

Weekly charts

Year-end charts

Certifications

References

Jason Mraz albums
2002 debut albums
Albums produced by John Alagía
Elektra Records albums